No. 244 Squadron RAF was a Royal Air Force Squadron formed as an anti–submarine unit in World War I and a bomber and anti-submarine unit in the Middle East in World War II.

History

Formation and World War I
No. 244 Squadron Royal Flying Corps was formed on 25 July 1918 as part of the reorganization of 255 Squadron and operated DH.6s from Bangor, Wales on anti-submarine patrols and disbanded on 22 January 1919.

Reformation in World War II
'S' Squadron was reformed at RAF Habbaniya in Iraq on 21 August 1939 by re-designating the Communication Flight, Iraq & Persia.  When 'S' squadron moved to RAF Shaibah on 1 November 1940 it was redesignated No. 244 Squadron RAF.  It was equipped with Vincents and was involved in quelling the Iraqi uprising in May 1941. It re-equipped in April 1942 with Blenheims for anti-submarine patrols and in May 1942 moved to RAF Sharjah in Sharjah.  Whilst based at RAF Sharjah there were detachment to airfields at Jask, Ras al Hadd and Masirah. Wellingtons were delivered in  February 1944 and the squadron moved to RAF Masirah on Masirah Island where it continued anti-submarine patrols. The Squadron was disbanded there on 1 May 1945.

Aircraft operated

References

Notes

Bibliography

External links
 RAF Habbaniya Association
 244 Squadron Association Newsletters
 History of No.'s 241–245 Squadrons at RAF Web
 244 Squadron history on the official RAF website

244
Aircraft squadrons of the Royal Air Force in World War II
Military units and formations established in 1918
1918 establishments in the United Kingdom
Military units and formations in Aden in World War II
Military units and formations disestablished in 1945